Auasi is a village in the east of Tutuila Island, American Samoa. One of the island's more populous villages, it is located on the south coast, close to the eastern tip of the island and to the smaller offshore island of Aunuu. It is located in Saole County.

Above the village is a waterfall known as Auasi Falls. This can be visited by following the stream in Auasi for about 30 minutes. It is particularly impressive after heavy rain.

Ferries for Aunu'u Island leave from the dock at Auasi.

Demographics

References

Villages in American Samoa